The 1963 Su-ao earthquake occurred on February 13 at 16:50 local time (08:50 UTC). The epicenter was located off the coast of Taiwan, near Su-ao, Yilan County. It had a magnitude of  7.3. The number of reported dead was 3–15 and the number of injured was 3–18.

Earthquake
The earthquake showed a weakly coupled interplate boundary in the nearby region.

Effects
A landslide occurred in the Su-ao-Hualien highway.

See also 
 List of earthquakes in 1963
 List of earthquakes in Taiwan

References 

Earthquakes in Taiwan
Su-ao Earthquake, 1963
1963 in Taiwan
Yilan County, Taiwan